Gregory Mark Preston (born June 2, 1960) is an American photographer and author, best known for his portraiture of artists within their creative spaces.

Early life 
Preston was first exposed to comic books at age eight and was immediately drawn to the visuals. At age 13, Preston was reintroduced to comics by a friend and from that point on he was hooked.

For college, Preston enrolled at UNLV for his first two years as a Fine Arts major, thinking he wanted to be an Illustrator, but really his desire was to be comic book artist. An instructor's advice that Preston seek out a more serious art school, with commercial sensibilities led him to enroll in Community College for Graphic Design. Preston bought his first camera, an Olympus OM-1, during that third year of studies, to shoot reference photos for his illustrations, and found his passion. After graduating with a degree in Graphic Design, Preston then moved to LA to study photography at Art Center College of Design. In school, Preston began shooting with Nikon and Hasselblad cameras; and his favorite photographer influences were Richard Avedon, Irving Penn, Albert Watson, Mark Seliger, and Andrew Eccles. Preston met Sharon Sampsel at Art Center, graduating in 1986, and the couple married the same year.

Career 
Preston would go on to find work as commercial advertising photographer, specializing in Hotel, Resort, Hospitality, Weddings, Portrait, Editorial, Food, and Architectural photography. Preston and his wife opened their Las Vegas based photography studio, Sampsel Preston Photography, on April 1, 1988.

Preston's love of the illustration & fantasy art and a suggestion from cartoonist Scott Shaw brought about the idea for Preston's project of portraits of artists within their studios. The 15-year long project brought together 101 cartoonists, comic book artists, and animators into an award-winning book of black and white portraits whose subjects included Frank Miller, Al Hirschfeld, Joe Barbera, Jack Kirby, Joe Simon, Moebius, Walt and Louise Simonson. The Artist Within: Portraits of Cartoonists, Comic Book Artists, Animators and Others  was published by Dark Horse Books in 2007.

After the success of his first book, Preston crowdfunded the companion book. Launched in March 2017, the Kickstarter campaign received funding of $30,624. 
The Artist Within: Behind the Lines: Book 2  was published in November 2017, and features both black and white and color portraits of more than one hundred artists such as Drew Struzan, Jack Kirby, Mark English, Keith Knight, Syd Mead, Steranko, Ron English, Glen Keane and many more.

Preston's portraits from The Artist Within project have been seen during the Academy Awards & Eisner Awards. Preston's The Artist Within portrait of artist Marie Severin was used by publications such as The Atlantic, The Washington Post, and NewsDay to announce her passing.

In past years, Preston has also been the official portrait photographer at such events as Spectrum Fantastic Art Live in Kansas City and CTN Animation Expo in Burbank, CA, setting up a pop-up studio to take portraits of the guest artists in attendance.
Preston has been an invited speaker at various venues. In 2011 he was a guest speaker the Society of Wedding and Portrait Photographers convention in London, to speak about being a hotel and resort photographer.
He has also spoken about his The Artist Within project before audiences at CTN Animation Expo, Loyola Marymount University, and at Art Center College of Design.

Bibliography 
 2007 The Artist Within: Portraits of Cartoonists, Comic Book Artists, Animators and Others 
 2017 The Artist Within: Behind the Lines: Book 2

References

External links 
 Sampsel Preston Phoography

Fine art photographers
20th-century American photographers
21st-century American photographers
1960 births
Living people
American portrait photographers
Place of birth missing (living people)